Sir John Robertson "Rob" Young GCMG (born 21 February 1945) is a retired British diplomat. He was the British High Commissioner to India from 1999 to 2003.

Career
Young was educated at King Edward VI School, Norwich, and Leicester University. He entered the Foreign Office in 1967 and his career focused on the Middle East. He retired in 2003.

References

External links
http://www.baps.org/News/1999/British-High-Commissioner-Sir-Rob-Young-visits-Shri-Swaminarayan-Madir-1882.aspx
The Daily Telegraph
https://books.google.com/books?id=YJin-qkgIeYC&pg=PA178&lpg=PA178&dq=rob+young+British+High+Commissioner+to+India&source=bl&ots=Zwbpe11a1r&sig=N2e6WOu3SQg456DnCPEeJOjktT0&hl=en&sa=X&ei=ECdfUaiEL8b44QSjz4DwBQ&ved=0CGUQ6AEwBw#v=onepage&q=rob%20young%20British%20High%20Commissioner%20to%20India&f=false
http://www.hindu.com/businessline/2000/09/29/stories/042932ju.htm

1945 births
Living people
People educated at Norwich School
Alumni of the University of Leicester
High Commissioners of the United Kingdom to India
Knights Grand Cross of the Order of St Michael and St George